Fabio Zamblera (born 7 April 1990) is an Italian retired footballer who played as a forward.

Career
In 2012/13, Zamblera played for A.C. Bellaria Igea Marina in the Italian Lega Pro Seconda Divisione, where he made five league appearances and scored three goals.

References

Living people
1990 births
Italian footballers
Footballers from Bergamo
Association football forwards
Atalanta B.C. players
Newcastle United F.C. players
U.C. Sampdoria players
A.S. Roma players
Brescia Calcio players
A.C. Bellaria Igea Marina players
Serie C players
Serie D players
Italy youth international footballers
Italian expatriate footballers
Expatriate footballers in England
Italian expatriate sportspeople in England